731 was a common year starting on Monday (link will display the full calendar) of the Julian calendar.  It may also refer to:

 731 (number)
 731 (The X-Files), the tenth episode of the third season of the American science fiction television series The X-Files
 731 BC, the ninth year of the 730s BC decade
 731 series, an AC electric multiple unit train type operated by Hokkaido Railway Company
 Area code 731, an area code in the U.S. state of Tennessee
 Battle of Hill 731, a fierce battle fought during World War II in southern Albania
 Unit 731, a covert biological and chemical warfare research and development unit of the Imperial Japanese Army